Senator Bogadus may refer to:

Charles Bogardus (1841–1929), Illinois State Senate
Robert Bogardus (1771–1841), New York State Senate